Antonio María Javierre Ortas S.D.B. (21 February 1921 – 1 February 2007) was a cardinal of the Catholic Church, and former prefect of the Congregation for Divine Worship and the Discipline of the Sacraments in the Vatican.

Javierre Ortas was born in Siétamo, Spain. He was ordained in 1949 and took his doctorate in theology in Louvain. For many years he lectured in fundamental theology and dogmatics in places such as Turin, Rome, Peru, Guatemala and Poland. During the Second Vatican Council he was a spokesman for the Spanish bishops in ecumenical questions.

In 1976 Pope Paul VI made him archbishop and secretary of the Congregation for Catholic Education. He became cardinal deacon in 1988, as well as the librarian and archivist of the Holy Roman Church. In 1992 he was elevated to cardinal priest and prefect for the Congregation for Divine Worship and the Discipline of the Sacraments, positions he kept until 1996. He died in 2007 in Rome.

In 1992, he participated in the decision to allow female altar servers in the Church. In 1994, Cardinal Javierre Ortas advising that women were permitted to serve at the discretion of the local bishop.

References

External links
Full cardinal's biography in Norwegian – katolsk.no
Obituary of the cardinal – katolsk.no

1921 births
2007 deaths
Salesians of Don Bosco
Spanish Roman Catholic titular archbishops
20th-century Spanish cardinals
Salesian cardinals
Participants in the Second Vatican Council
Members of the Congregation for Divine Worship and the Discipline of the Sacraments
Members of the Congregation for Catholic Education
Cardinals created by Pope John Paul II
Salesian Pontifical University alumni